Free Jazz: A Collective Improvisation is the sixth album by jazz saxophonist and composer Ornette Coleman, released on Atlantic Records in 1961, his fourth for the label. Its title established the name of the then-nascent free jazz movement. The recording session took place on December 21, 1960, at A&R Studios in New York City. The sole outtake from the album session, "First Take," was later released on the 1971 compilation Twins.

The music 
The music is a continuous free improvisation with only a few brief pre-determined sections. The music was recorded in one single “take” with no overdubbing or editing.

The album features what Coleman called a “double quartet,” i.e., two self-contained jazz quartets, each with two wind instruments and each with a rhythm section consisting of bass and drums. The two quartets are heard in separate channels with Coleman’s regular group in the left channel and the second quartet in the right.

The two quartets play simultaneously with the two rhythm sections providing a dense rhythmic foundation over which the wind players either solo or provide freeform commentaries that often turn into full-scale collective improvisation interspersed with pre-determined composed passages. The composed thematic material can be considered a series of brief, dissonant fanfares for the horns which serve as interludes between solos. Not least among the album's achievements was that it was the first album-length improvisation, nearly forty minutes, which was unheard of at the time.

The original LP package incorporated Jackson Pollock's 1954 painting The White Light. The cover was a gatefold with a cutout window in the lower right corner allowing a glimpse of the painting; opening the cover revealed the full artwork, along with liner notes by critic Martin Williams. Coleman was a fan of Pollock as well as a painter, and his 1966 LP The Empty Foxhole features Coleman's own artwork.

Reception
In the January 18, 1962 issue of Down Beat magazine, in a special review titled "Double View of a Double Quartet," Pete Welding awarded the album Five Stars while John A. Tynan rated it No Stars.

The album was identified by Chris Kelsey in his Allmusic essay "Free Jazz: A Subjective History" as one of the 20 Essential Free Jazz albums. It served as the blueprint for later large-ensemble free jazz recordings such as Ascension by John Coltrane and Machine Gun by Peter Brötzmann.

On March 3, 1998, Free Jazz was reissued on compact disc by Rhino Records as part of its Atlantic 50 series. The "Free Jazz" track, split into two sections for each side of the LP, appeared here in continuous uninterrupted form, along with a bonus track of the previously issued "First Take."

Track listing of the original LP
Composition by Ornette Coleman. On compact disc "Free Jazz" is presented as one continuous track with a running time listed as 37:03.

Side one

Side two

1998 reissue bonus track

Timing of the various sections
 00:00  Polyphonic introduction
 00:07  Ensemble introduction to Eric Dolphy
 00:22  Eric Dolphy – bass clarinet solo (right channel)
 05:12  Ensemble introduction to Freddie Hubbard
 05:40  Freddie Hubbard – trumpet solo (right channel)
 09:54  Ensemble introduction to Ornette Coleman
 10:05  Ornette Coleman alto saxophone solo (left channel)
 19:36  Ensemble Introduction to Don Cherry
 19:48  Don Cherry – pocket trumpet solo (left channel)
 25:21  Ensemble Introduction to Charlie Haden
 25:26  Charlie Haden – bass solo (right channel)
 29:51  Ensemble introduction to Scott LaFaro
 30:00  Scott LaFaro – bass solo (left channel)
 33:47  Polyphonic ensemble introduction to Ed Blackwell 
 34:00  Ed Blackwell – drum solo (right channel) 
 35:19  Ensemble pitch introduction to Billy Higgins 
 35:28  Billy Higgins – drum solo (left channel)

Personnel
Left channel
 Ornette Coleman – alto saxophone
 Don Cherry – pocket trumpet
 Scott LaFaro – bass
 Billy Higgins – drums
Right channel
 Eric Dolphy – bass clarinet
 Freddie Hubbard – trumpet
 Charlie Haden – bass
 Ed Blackwell – drums

Production
 Tom Dowd – recording engineer
 Nesuhi Ertegün – producer

References

1961 albums
Atlantic Records albums
Ornette Coleman albums
Albums produced by Nesuhi Ertegun
Free jazz albums
Avant-garde jazz albums